The Massey Heights are prominent, flat-topped rock heights, with steeply cliffed sides,  southwest of Andreassen Point on James Ross Island, Antarctica. They were surveyed by the Falkland Islands Dependencies Survey (FIDS) in 1945 and 1955, and are named for Paul Massey, FIDS medical officer at Hope Bay in 1955.

References

Mountains of Graham Land
Landforms of James Ross Island